Mansour Ali Haseeb FRCP FRCPh (1 January 1910, Al Gitaina – 29 September 1973, Omdurman) was a Sudanese professor of microbiology and parasitology.

Haseeb was born into a family of scholars. He attended and graduated with the Diploma of Kitchener School of Medicine (DKSM) and went to the United Kingdom to complete a Diploma of Bacteriology. Haseeb was trained around Sudan before being appointed Director of the Stack Medical Research Laboratories, the first Sudanese Dean of the Faculty of Medicine at the University of Khartoum, and the Sudan Medical Research Council Chairman.

Haseeb made valuable contributions through his services in vaccine production and implementation programs. In addition, he championed medical research in Sudan to the extent that he is remembered as The Godfather Of Sudan's Laboratory Medicine. Haseeb was the Mayor of Omdurman and died suddenly aged 63, shortly after receiving Shousha Prize from the World Health Organization.

Early life and education 
Mansour Ali Haseeb was born on 1 January 1910 in Al Gitaina, Sudan, to Sheikh Ali Haseeb, the Judge of Al Gitana, and Fatma Mohamed. His family is originally from Berber, Sudan and is known for their scholar.

He attended Atbara School (or between Berber, Atbara and Port Sudan) before moving to Khartoum to attendGordon Memorial College and pursue medical education at Kitchener School of Medicine (now the Faculty of Medicine, University of Khartoum) and Khartoum Civil Hospital, and graduated with the Diploma of Kitchener School of Medicine (DKSM) in 1937 (or 1934). He became interested in bacteriology and parasitology, and then went to the United Kingdom and obtained a Diploma in Bacteriology in 1943 (or 1946).

Mediccal career and research 
Haseeb did his medical training at Khartoum, Dongola, Haifa, Singa and Geneina Hospitals, before being appointed Director of the Stack Medical Research Laboratories (1952–1962). He left Stack, in 1963, succeeded by Mohamed Hamad Satti, to become a professor of Microbiology and Parasitology, and the first Sudanese Dean of the Faculty of Medicine at the University of Khartoum until 1969. He was an examiner of the Royal Society of Health in Khartoum, and, in 1973, he was appointed Chairman of the Sudan Medical Research Council. 
 
Bacteriology and parasitology were to be Haseeb's major focus. He made valuable contributions through his services in the vaccine production and implementation programs, most notably in combating smallpox, rabies and epidemic meningitis, He wrote several papers on parasitic infections and contagious diseases common to Sudan.
 
In 1954, Haseeb accompanied Dr Telford H. Work and Dr Richard Moreland Taylor in an expedition to research yellow fever on Baggara tribespeople, Nuba villages, and the Dinka people. The expedition was documented in a film, Reconnaissance for Yellow Fever in the Nuba Mountains, Southern Sudan. Hasseb contributed to 40 scientific papers, published in Nature, the Lancet, the British Medical Journal,  and Journal of Hygiene. Hasseb was Editor-in-Chief of the Sudan Medical Journal from 1948 to 1958.
 
Haseeb dedicated his book A Monograph on Biomedical Research in Sudan (1970) to the National Council of Research to benefit young researchers. He is considered The Godfather Of Sudan's Laboratory Medicine. In May 1973, Harry Hoogstraal stated, “Professor Mansour Haseeb has been more intimately associated than any other living person with adding to Sudanese biomedical knowledge and sharing [the] vast experience with younger generations of physicians and scientists.”

Mayor of Omdurman 

Haseeb was appointed Mayor of Omdurman. He was invited by Willy Brandt (then Mayor of West Berlin) to visit West Berlin in 1963, and represented Omdurman in welcoming Queen Elizabeth II when she visited in February 1965.

Personal life and death 
Haseeb married Fatma El Bereir in 1944, and they had five children. He enjoyed playing tennis, and translating from English to Arabic, e.g., Al Hakeem .

Haseeb died suddenly on 29 September 1973, aged 63, shortly after receiving Shousha Prize from the World Health Organization. His obituary ceremony reflected the feelings of the medical community and included a eulogy by Professor Abdullah El Tayib, then the President of the University of Khartoum.

Awards and honours 
Haseeb was awarded the Order of the Star of Ethiopia by H.M. Emperor of Ethiopia, Haile Selassie I, in 1960. In 1962, he received the Order of Merit from the United Arab Republic.
 
Haseeb was elected a Fellow of the Royal College of Pathologists in 1965 and a Fellow of the Royal College of Physicians of London in 1969. He received the Shousha Medal and Prize from the World Health Organization on 24 January 1973, in recognition of his contribution to public health and medical education.
 
The University of Khartoum named buildings as a dedication to his memory, including Haseeb Dormitory.

Notes

References

External links 

 Reconnaissance for Yellow Fever in the Nuba Mountains, Southern Sudan, 25 min film in English (direct YouTube link)

University of Khartoum alumni
Sudanese scientists
1913 births
2005 deaths
Sudanese people
Sudanese physicians
Fellows of the Royal College of Physicians
Fellows of the Royal College of Pathologists
Dr A.T. Shousha Foundation Prize and Fellowship laureates
Recipients of the Order of Merit (Egypt)
Recipients of orders, decorations, and medals of Ethiopia